Oksana Shyshkova (born 10 June 1991) is a Ukrainian visually impaired cross-country skier and biathlete. She has competed at the Winter Paralympics thrice in 2010, 2014 and 2018. Oksana Shyshkova claimed 6 medals at the 2017 IPC World Championships, which is her notable achievement in the sport of Nordic skiing. She competed at the 2022 Winter Paralympics, winning a gold medal, in Women's 6 kilometres. 

She claimed her maiden Paralympic gold medal after clinching a gold medal in the women's 10km visually impaired biathlon event as a part of the 2018 Winter Paralympics.

Career 
Oksana made her Paralympic debut during the 2010 Winter Paralympics representing Ukraine and went medalless at the event. She then went onto compete at the 2014 Winter Paralympics and claimed 4 bronze medals in the Winter Paralympic event including 3 in the biathlon events and a solitary medal in the cross-country skiing event with the assistance of her sighted guide, Lada Nesterenko.

Oksana Shyshkova claimed a silver medal in the women's 6km visually impaired biathlon event during the 2018 Winter Paralympics, which is also her first Paralympic silver medal and also her fifth medal in her Paralympic career.

References

External links 
 

1991 births
Living people
Ukrainian female biathletes
Ukrainian female cross-country skiers
Biathletes at the 2010 Winter Paralympics
Biathletes at the 2014 Winter Paralympics
Biathletes at the 2018 Winter Paralympics
Biathletes at the 2022 Winter Paralympics
Cross-country skiers at the 2010 Winter Paralympics
Cross-country skiers at the 2014 Winter Paralympics
Cross-country skiers at the 2018 Winter Paralympics
Cross-country skiers at the 2022 Winter Paralympics
Paralympic biathletes of Ukraine
Paralympic cross-country skiers of Ukraine
Paralympic gold medalists for Ukraine
Paralympic silver medalists for Ukraine
Paralympic bronze medalists for Ukraine
Medalists at the 2014 Winter Paralympics
Medalists at the 2018 Winter Paralympics
Medalists at the 2022 Winter Paralympics
Ukrainian blind people
Visually impaired category Paralympic competitors
Sportspeople from Kharkiv
Paralympic medalists in cross-country skiing
Paralympic medalists in biathlon
21st-century Ukrainian women